John E. Huffman (born in 1957 in Missouri) is an American politician, who was a Republican member of the Oregon House of Representatives representing District 59 from his appointment on August 27, 2007 to fill the vacancy caused by the resignation of John Dallum, until his own resignation on October 28, 2017 to take a job in the Trump administration.

Elections
2012 Huffman was unopposed for the May 15, 2012 Republican Primary, winning with 5,352 votes, and won the November 6, 2012 General election with 17,466 votes (66.7%) against Democratic nominee Gary Ollerenshaw.
2008 Huffman was unopposed for the May 20, 2008 Republican Primary, winning with 5,385 votes, and won the November 4, 2008 General election with 15,107 votes (59.1%) against Democratic nominee Mike Ahern
2010 Huffman won the May 18, 2010 Republican Primary with 5,961 votes (92.5%), and won the November 2, 2010 General election with 15,033 votes (69.5%) against Democratic nominee Will Boettner.

References

External links
Official page at the Oregon Legislative Assembly
Campaign site
 

Date of birth missing (living people)
1957 births
Living people
Oregon Republicans
People from Missouri
People from The Dalles, Oregon
21st-century American politicians